Albin Julius (born Albin Julius Martinek, 16 October 1967 – 4 May 2022) was an Austrian martial music and industrial artist; his primary musical project was called Der Blutharsch. His ancestors came to Austria from Bohemia, where they came from the city of Jihlava.

Julius founded the history-themed, folk-based ensemble, The Moon Lay Hidden Beneath a Cloud. His first release as Der Blutharsch was a self-titled picture disc, limited to 250 copies.

Julius released all Der Blutharsch music on his own record label, Wir Kapitulieren Niemals (WKN, which translates: We Never Surrender).  Julius founded the HauRuck! music label, which releases albums by several Neofolk and industrial groups.

References

External links 
 Albin Julius at Discogs

1967 births
2022 deaths
Austrian male musicians
Austrian record producers
Austrian people of Czech descent